Katia Zini (born 23 June 1981 in Sondalo, Italy) is an Italian short track speed skater who won bronze in the 3000m relay at the 2006 Winter Olympics.  She also skated in the 2002 Winter Olympics and the 2010 Winter Olympics.  She is a cousin of speed skater Mara Zini who was on the same medal winning relay.

References

1981 births
Living people
People from Sondalo
Italian female speed skaters
Italian female short track speed skaters
Short track speed skaters at the 2006 Winter Olympics
Short track speed skaters at the 2010 Winter Olympics
Olympic short track speed skaters of Italy
Olympic bronze medalists for Italy
Olympic medalists in short track speed skating
Speed skaters of Gruppo Sportivo Esercito
Medalists at the 2006 Winter Olympics
Sportspeople from the Province of Sondrio